In differential geometry, a pseudo-Riemannian manifold, also called a semi-Riemannian manifold, is a differentiable manifold with a metric tensor that is everywhere nondegenerate.  This is a generalization of a Riemannian manifold in which the requirement of positive-definiteness is relaxed. 

Every tangent space of a pseudo-Riemannian manifold is a pseudo-Euclidean vector space.

A special case used in general relativity is a four-dimensional Lorentzian manifold for modeling spacetime, where tangent vectors can be classified as timelike, null, and spacelike.

Introduction

Manifolds 

In differential geometry, a differentiable manifold is a space which is locally similar to a Euclidean space. In an n-dimensional Euclidean space any point can be specified by n real numbers. These are called the coordinates of the point.

An n-dimensional differentiable manifold is a generalisation of n-dimensional Euclidean space. In a manifold it may only be possible to define coordinates locally. This is achieved by defining coordinate patches: subsets of the manifold which can be mapped into n-dimensional Euclidean space.

See Manifold, Differentiable manifold, Coordinate patch for more details.

Tangent spaces and metric tensors 

Associated with each point  in an -dimensional differentiable manifold  is a tangent space (denoted ). This is an -dimensional vector space whose elements can be thought of as equivalence classes of curves passing through the point .

A metric tensor is a non-degenerate, smooth, symmetric, bilinear map that assigns a real number to pairs of tangent vectors at each tangent space of the manifold. Denoting the metric tensor by  we can express this as 

The map is symmetric and bilinear so if  are tangent vectors at a point  to the manifold  then we have
 
 
for any real number .

That  is non-degenerate means there is no non-zero  such  that  for all .

Metric signatures 

Given a metric tensor g on an n-dimensional real manifold, the quadratic form  associated with the metric tensor applied to each vector of any orthogonal basis produces n real values. By Sylvester's law of inertia, the number of each positive, negative and zero values produced in this manner are invariants of the metric tensor, independent of the choice of orthogonal basis. The signature  of the metric tensor gives these numbers, shown in the same order. A non-degenerate metric tensor has  and the signature may be denoted (p, q), where .

Definition 

A pseudo-Riemannian manifold  is a differentiable manifold  equipped with an everywhere non-degenerate, smooth, symmetric metric tensor .

Such a metric is called a pseudo-Riemannian metric.  Applied to a vector field, the resulting scalar field value at any point of the manifold can be positive, negative or zero.

The non-degeneracy condition together with continuity implies that p and q remain unchanged throughout the manifold (assuming it is connected).

Properties of pseudo-Riemannian manifolds

Just as Euclidean space  can be thought of as the model Riemannian manifold, Minkowski space  with the flat Minkowski metric is the model Lorentzian manifold.

Some basic theorems of Riemannian geometry can be generalized to the pseudo-Riemannian case. In particular, the fundamental theorem of Riemannian geometry is true of pseudo-Riemannian manifolds as well. This allows one to speak of the Levi-Civita connection on a pseudo-Riemannian manifold along with the associated curvature tensor. On the other hand, there are many theorems in Riemannian geometry which do not hold in the generalized case. For example, it is not true that every smooth manifold admits a pseudo-Riemannian metric of a given signature; there are certain topological obstructions. Furthermore, a submanifold does not always inherit the structure of a pseudo-Riemannian manifold; for example, the metric tensor becomes zero on any light-like curve. The Clifton–Pohl torus provides an example of a pseudo-Riemannian manifold that is compact but not complete, a combination of properties that the Hopf–Rinow theorem disallows for Riemannian manifolds.

Lorentzian manifold

Such metrics are called Lorentzian metrics. They are named after the Dutch physicist Hendrik Lorentz.

Applications in physics 

After Riemannian manifolds, Lorentzian manifolds form the most important subclass of pseudo-Riemannian manifolds. They are important in applications of general relativity.

A principal premise of general relativity is that spacetime can be modeled as a 4-dimensional Lorentzian manifold of signature  or, equivalently, . Unlike Riemannian manifolds with positive-definite metrics, an indefinite signature allows tangent vectors to be classified into timelike, null or spacelike.

See also 
Causality conditions
Globally hyperbolic manifold
Hyperbolic partial differential equation
Orientable manifold
Spacetime

Notes

References

.

External links
 

Bernhard Riemann
Differential geometry

Riemannian geometry
Riemannian manifolds
Smooth manifolds